Bipa or BIPA may refer to:

Bipa
 Bipa, korean musical instrument
 Bipa, Guinea

BIPA
 Biometric Information Privacy Act, Illinois law
 , Austrian retailer
 BIPA Odessa, Ukrainian basketball club
 British Indian Psychiatric Association
 British–Irish Parliamentary Assembly
 Patreksfjörður Airport, Iceland (by ICAO code)